This List of Bays of Shetland Islands summarises the bays that are located on the islands of the Shetland Islands in Scotland.

Balta
The small island of Balta has no bays.

Bigga

Bressay

Brother Isle
Brother Isle has no bays.

East Burra

Fair Isle

Fetlar

Foula

Hascosay

Hildasay

Lamba

Linga
The small island of Linga has no bays.

Mainland

Mousa

Muckle Roe

Isle of Noss

Oxna  Shetland

Papa

Papa Little

Papa Stour

Samphrey
The small island of Samphrey has no bays.

South Havra

Trondra
The island of Trondra has no bays.

Unst

Uyea, Unst

Vaila

Vementry

West Burra

West Linga

Whalsay

Yell

See also
 List of bays of Scotland
 List of bays of the Outer Hebrides
 List of bays of the Inner Hebrides
 List of bays of the Orkney Islands

References

Bays of Scotland
Bays of Shetland
Lists of landforms of Scotland
Shetland